Herbert Huber may refer to:
 Herbert Huber (skier), Austrian alpine skier
 Herbert Huber (luger), Italian luger
 Herbert Huber (botanist), German botanist